Steve Rubanguka (born 14 October 1996) is a Rwandan professional footballer who plays as a midfielder for the Moldovan Super Liga club FC Zimbru Chisinau and the Rwanda national team.

Club career

Youth
Rubanguka's football career started in 2008 at the age of 12 in FC Blaasveld. The following year, he joined KVC Willebroek-Meerhof for two seasons and then joined K. Londerzeel S.K. He played there for two years and then left for one season to K.V. Mechelen and then one season with K.S.K. Heist.

Early career in Belgium
After KSK Heist Rubanguka joined RFC Wetteren in 2015 for two years, and after that he chose in 2017 for K. Patro Eisden Maasmechelen amid interest from K.V.C. Westerlo and Birmingham City FC from England. There he played for two seasons and then ended up in K. Rupel Boom F.C. in 2019. In August 2020, Rubanguka left Rupel Boom FC for Karaiskakis in Greece.

Karaiskakis
On 16 January 2021, Rubanguka made his professional debut for Karaiskakis in a game against Levadiakos.

FC Zimbru Chișinău 
Rubanguka continued his professional career at FC Zimbru Chisinau.

International career
Rubanguka was called up to the Rwanda national team in November 2018 and November 2020 but sat on the bench two times. In March 2021, he was called up for the games against Mozambique and Cameroon for the 2021 Africa Cup of Nations qualification. He made his debut against Mozambique and played 45 minutes.

References

External links
 
 

Living people
1996 births
Rwandan footballers
Belgian footballers
Association football midfielders
Rwanda international footballers
K. Patro Eisden Maasmechelen players
K. Rupel Boom F.C. players
A.E. Karaiskakis F.C. players
Moldovan footballers